Blakely Island (SENĆOŦEN: XEMXEMIȽĆ) in San Juan County, Washington is the sixth largest island in the San Juan Islands of Washington State, United States, encompassing a land area of 16.852 km (6.507 sq m). It is separated from Cypress Island to the east by Rosario Strait. The population was 56 persons as of the 2000 census.

There is no public ferry service to Blakely Island. Access is only by boat or private ferry, arriving at the marina at the northern tip of the island. There is also a private airstrip for the exclusive use of property owners. The only services available on Blakely Island are at a general store and cafe, located at the marina and open seasonally.  Seattle Pacific University runs a 967-acre biological field station on Blakely Island.

Blakely Island was named by Charles Wilkes during the Wilkes Expedition of 1838-1842, in honor of Johnston Blakeley, a naval commander during the War of 1812. Thatcher bay, on the island's east coast, was the site of seasonal Samish tribal villages and, during the territorial period, the mill town of Thatcher, Washington. In 2014, toxic creosote pilings left over from earlier habitation were removed from the waters of Thatcher bay.

The island is hilly and heavily forested, with few maintained roads or paths. There are two freshwater lakes, Horseshoe Lake and Spencer Lake, at the center of the island. A freshwater creek, Spencer creek, flows from Spencer Lake into Thatcher Bay.

Climate

See also

References

External links

Blakely Island: Block 2000, Census Tract 9605, San Juan County, Washington United States Census Bureau

San Juan Islands
Unincorporated communities in San Juan County, Washington
Unincorporated communities in Washington (state)